Yaniish Engutsamy, popularly known as RJ Yaniish, is a Mauritian radio jockey, presenter based in Mauritius. He is best known as the host of Radio Plus show Allô-Maurice & Cocktail Junction. He now hosts the Evening News at 7 PM on Radio Plus, and the 7-10 PM slot, the You & i Show  from Monday to Thursday.

Radio career

TikTok Awards Night Mauritius
First launched by Radio Plus (Mauritius), Yaniish has also been a presenter for the TikTok Awards Night (Mauritius), which was held in Mauritius at the Caudan Arts Centre in Port Louis on 23 December 2019.

References

External links 
 
 

Living people
Year of birth missing (living people)
Mauritian radio personalities